Francesco Costa (born May 28, 1985) is a bobsledder from Italy. He competed for Italy at the 2014 Winter Olympics in the four-man bobsleigh event.

Francesco Costa is an athlete of the Gruppo Sportivo Fiamme Oro.

References

1985 births
Living people
Olympic bobsledders of Italy
Bobsledders at the 2014 Winter Olympics
Bobsledders at the 2018 Winter Olympics
Italian male bobsledders
Bobsledders of Fiamme Oro